Jimmy Jean-Joseph (born 15 October 1972 in Saint-Esprit, Martinique) is a former French athlete who specialised in the 800 meters. Jean-Joseph competed at the 1996 Summer Olympics.

References 

  sports reference

French male middle-distance runners
Olympic athletes of France
French people of Martiniquais descent
Athletes (track and field) at the 1996 Summer Olympics
1972 births
Living people